The Dadukhel mine is one of the largest gypsum mines in Pakistan. The mine is located in Punjab. The mine has reserves amounting to 53 million tonnes of gypsum.

See also
List of mines in Pakistan

References

Mines in Pakistan
Gypsum mines in Pakistan